The 51st Grand Bell Awards, also known as Daejong Film Awards, are determined and presented annually by The Motion Pictures Association of Korea for excellence in film in South Korea. The Grand Bell Awards were first presented in 1962 and have gained prestige as the Korean equivalent of the American Academy Awards.

51st ceremony
The 51st Grand Bell Awards ceremony was held at the KBS Hall in Yeouido, Seoul on November 21, 2014 and hosted by Shin Hyun-joon, Uhm Jung-hwa and Oh Man-seok.

Nominations and winners
(Winners denoted in bold)

References

External links 
 

Grand Bell Awards
Grand Bell Awards
Grand Bell Awards